Pavlov is a municipality and village in Břeclav District in the South Moravian Region of the Czech Republic. It has about 600 inhabitants.

Geography
It lies in the Pavlov Hills within the Mikulov Highlands.

Pavlov is located in the Pálava Protected Landscape Area.

See also
Pavlovian culture

References

Villages in Břeclav District